The year 1952 in television involved some significant events.
Below is a list of television-related events during 1952.



Events

January 14 - Today was first aired on NBC with Dave Garroway as host.
July 7 - Turkey's first television station was opened ITU TV.
July 20 – Arrow to the Heart, the first collaboration between director Rudolph Cartier and scriptwriter Nigel Kneale, is broadcast by BBC Television.
August 1 – First TV broadcast in the Dominican Republic by La Voz Dominicana, a TV station based on the radio station of the same name.
September 6 – Television debuts in Canada with the initiation of CBFT in Montreal, Quebec.
September 8 – CBLT in Toronto, Ontario begins broadcasting as Canada's second TV station.
September 20 – The first commercial Ultra High Frequency (UHF) television station in the world, KPTV (now a Fox company affiliate), begins broadcasting in Portland, Oregon on channel 27.
October 7 – WFIL-TV Philadelphia's afternoon series Bandstand, which will become American Bandstand, changes emphasis to teens dancing to popular records
November 16 – CBS Television City in Hollywood, California opens.
The first political advertisements appear on US television. Democrats buy a 30-minute time segment for their candidate, Adlai Stevenson. Stevenson receives unfavorable mail for interfering with a broadcast of I Love Lucy. Dwight Eisenhower buys 20 second commercial segments and wins the election.
The first telecast of an atomic bomb detonation (KTLA).
The U.S. Federal Communications Commission reserved channels for non-commercial, public broadcasting.
There were approximately 146,000 television sets in Canada and most antennas were pointed towards WBEN-TV (now WIVB) in Buffalo, New York.
 Sooty, a little yellow glove puppet teddy bear makes his debut on BBC's Talent Night.

Programs/programmes
Amos & Andy (1951–1953)
Author Meets the Critics (1947–1954)
Bozo the Clown (1948–present)
Café Continental (UK) (1947–1953)
Candid Camera (1948–present)
Cisco Kid (1950–1956)
The Colgate Comedy Hour (1950-1955)
Come Dancing (UK) (1949–1995)
Dragnet (1951–1959)
Gillette Cavalcade of Sports (1946–1960)
Hallmark Hall of Fame (1951–present)
Hawkins Falls (1950, 1951–1955)
Howdy Doody (1947–1960)
I Love Lucy (1951–1960)
Juvenile Jury (1947–1954)
Kaleidoscope (UK) (1946–1953)
Kraft Television Theater (1947–1958)
Kukla, Fran and Ollie (1947–1957)
Life with Elizabeth (1952–1955)
Love of Life (1951–1980)
Martin Kane, Private Eye (1949–1954)
Meet the Press (1947–present)
Muffin the Mule (UK) (1946–1955)
Search for Tomorrow (1951–1986)
Television Newsreel (UK) (1948–1954)
The Ed Sullivan Show (1948–1971)
The George Burns and Gracie Allen Show (1950–1958)
The Goldbergs (1949–1955)
The Jack Benny Show (1950–1965)
The Roy Rogers Show (1951–1957)
The Texaco Star Theater (1948–1953)
The Voice of Firestone (1949–1963)
Truth or Consequences (1950–1988)
What's My Line (1950–1967)
Your Hit Parade (1950–1959)
Your Show of Shows (1950–1954)

Debuts
January 6 - Claudia on NBC (moved to CBS on March 31, 1952) 
January 14 – The Today Show on NBC (1952–present)
March 1 – Death Valley Days in syndication (1952–1975)
June 19 – I've Got a Secret on CBS (1952–1967)
June 30 – the soap opera The Guiding Light (1952–2009) on CBS,  which began on radio in 1937, becoming the longest-running regularly scheduled drama in television history
July 10 - The prime time version of A Date with Judy debuts on ABC.
September –  the religious drama This Is the Life on DuMont, and ran until the late 1980s
September 19 – Adventures of Superman in syndication (1952–1958)
October 26 – Victory at Sea (1952–1953) on NBC, one of the first historic documentary series
October 3 –  Our Miss Brooks (1952-1956) on CBS
November 1 – Hockey Night in Canada on CBC (1952–present)
November 6 – Biff Baker, U.S.A. on CBS (1952–1953)
November 8 – My Hero on NBC (1952–1953)
December 1 – The Abbott and Costello Show in syndication (1952–1954)
December 15 – Flower Pot Men on BBC Television (1952)
American Bandstand, originally called Bandstand, as a local program in Philadelphia (1952–1989)
Life Is Worth Living with Bishop Fulton J. Sheen on DuMont (1952–1955), then on ABC (1955–1957)
My Little Margie (1952–1955), starring Gale Storm
See It Now, hosted by Edward R. Murrow
The Adventures of Ozzie and Harriet on ABC (1952–1966)
The Ernie Kovacs Show, where Kovacs explores the boundaries of television technology with his use of special effects (1952–1953)
Meet the Masters, a program about classical music, on NBC and WGN-TV
This Is Your Life in the U.S. (1952–1961)
Life with Elizabeth, a sitcom featuring Betty White (1952–1955)

Ending during 1952

Births

References